Upper Umpqua is an extinct Athabaskan language formerly spoken along the south fork of the Umpqua River in west-central Oregon by Upper Umpqua (Etnemitane) people in the vicinity of modern Roseburg. It has been extinct for at least fifty years and little is known about it other than it belongs to the same Oregon Athabaskan cluster of Pacific Coast Athabaskan languages as the Lower Rogue River language, Upper Rogue River language and Chetco-Tolowa. 

The most important documentation of Upper Umpqua is the extensive vocabulary obtained by Horatio Hale in 1841 (published in Hale 1846). Melville Jacobs and John P. Harrington were able to collect fragmentary data from the last speakers as late as the 1940s (Golla 2011:70-72). Although known to early explorers and settlers as Umpqua, the language is now usually called Upper Umpqua to distinguish it from the unrelated Oregon Coast Penutian language Lower Umpqua (Kuitsh or Siuslaw language) that was spoken closer to the coast in the same area.

References 

 Golla, Victor (2011). California Indian Languages. Berkeley: University of California Press. .
 Hale, Horatio (1846). Ethnography and Philology. Vol. 6 of United States Exploring Expedition.... Under the Command of Charles Wilkes, U.S.N. Philadelphia: Lea and Blanchard.

External links
Oregon Athabascan languages
map of region 

Pacific Coast Athabaskan languages
Extinct languages of North America
Languages extinct in the 1950s